In enzymology, a 4-hydroxy-3-methylbut-2-en-1-yl diphosphate synthase (HMB-PP synthase, IspG) is an enzyme that catalyzes the chemical reaction

2-C-methyl-D-erythritol 2,4-cyclodiphosphate + protein-dithiol  (E)-4-hydroxy-3-methylbut-2-en-1-yl diphosphate + H2O + protein-disulfide

The substrate of this enzyme is 2-C-methyl-D-erythritol 2,4-cyclodiphosphate (MEcPP) and the product is (E)-4-hydroxy-3-methylbut-2-en-1-yl diphosphate (HMB-PP). Electrons are donated by two reduced ferredoxin proteins per reaction.

This enzyme participates in the MEP pathway (non-mevalonate pathway) of Isoprenoid precursor biosynthesis.

Nomenclature 

This enzyme belongs to the family of oxidoreductases, specifically those acting on CH or CH2 groups with a disulfide as acceptor. The systematic name of this enzyme class is (E)-4-hydroxy-3-methylbut-2-en-1-yl-diphosphate:protein-disulfide oxidoreductase (hydrating).

References

Further reading 

 

EC 1.17.7
Enzymes of unknown structure